Samos is an unincorporated community in Mississippi County, in the U.S. state of Missouri.

History
A post office called Samos was established in 1884, and remained in operation until 1938. The name is a transfer from the island of Samos, in Greece.

References

Unincorporated communities in Mississippi County, Missouri
Unincorporated communities in Missouri